Canton High School is a public high school located in Canton, Texas (USA). It is part of the Canton Independent School District located in central Van Zandt County and classified as a 4A school by the UIL.  In 2015, the school was rated "Met Standard" by the Texas Education Agency.

Athletics
The Canton Eagles compete in the following sports - 

Cross Country, Volleyball, Football, Basketball, Powerlifting, Golf, Tennis, Track, Softball, Baseball, Archery, & Fishing Team.

State Titles
Archery - 
2010(3A), 2011(3A), 2012(3A), 2013(3A)
Boys Cross Country - 
1998(3A), 2000(3A)
Girls Golf - 
1986(3A), 1988(3A)
Girls Powerlifting - 
2010(3A), 2011(3A), 2012(3A)

Rivals
Brownsboro Bears
Mabank Panthers
Van Vandals
Wills Point Tigers

Academics
UIL Spelling Champions -
2007(3A)

Band
Marching Band State Champions 
2002(3A), 2004(3A), 2006(3A), 2018(4A)

Notable alumni 

Colten Brewer, professional baseball player
G. J. Kinne, professional football coach and former player
Keavon Milton, former professional football player

References

External links
 

Schools in Van Zandt County, Texas
Public high schools in Texas